The 1972 South African Open, also known by its sponsored name South African Breweries Open, was a combined men's and women's tennis tournament played on outdoor hard courts at the Ellis Park Tennis Stadium in Johannesburg, South Africa that was part of the 1972 Commercial Union Assurance Grand Prix. It was the 69th edition of the tournament and was held from 8 April through 13 April 1972. The tournament had a record attendance of 85,000. World Championship Tennis (WCT) players were barred from participating in the event. Cliff Richey won the men's singles titles and the accompanying £2,570 first-prize money while Evonne Goolagong earned £1,030 first-prize money for her singles title.

Finals

Men's singles
 Cliff Richey defeated  Manuel Orantes 6–4, 7–5, 3–6, 6–4

Women's singles
 Evonne Goolagong defeated  Virginia Wade 4–6, 6–3, 6–0

Men's doubles
 Bob Hewitt /  Frew McMillan defeated  Georges Goven /  Ray Moore 6–2, 6–2, 6–4

Women's doubles
 Evonne Goolagong /  Helen Gourlay defeated  Winnie Shaw /  Joyce Williams 6–4, 6–4

Mixed doubles
 Virginia Wade /  Martin Mulligan defeated  Patricia Pretorius /  Frew McMillan 6–0, 4–6, 6–4

References

External links
 AP Archive footage of men's final
 ITF tournament edition details

South African Open
South African Open (tennis)
Open
Sports competitions in Johannesburg
1970s in Johannesburg
March 1972 sports events in Africa
April 1972 sports events in Africa